Jóns saga leikara is a medieval Icelandic romance saga.

Synopsis 

Kalinke and Mitchell summarise the saga thus:

Composed in Iceland, presumably in the fourteenth century. The saga relates the strange adventures encountered by Jon, a young knight, in Flæmingialand. He is welcomed by the king and witnesses mysterious events during a great banquet and again the following morning, when a fierce wolf is captured. Jon requests the wolf as a parting gift, and it turns out that the beast is in reality Sigurðr, the king's son, upon whom his stepmother had placed a spell. Jon and Sigurðr become sworn brothers, and Jon marries the king's daughter.

Manuscripts 

Kalinke and Mitchell identified the following manuscripts of the saga:

Editions and translations 

 "Jons saga leikara," ed. by Martin Soderback (Diss. Chicago, 1949)

References 

Chivalric sagas
Icelandic literature
Old Norse literature